XIX Cuadrangular Cuna de Futbol Mexicano or simply known as Copa Pachuca is the 19th edition of the Copa Pachuca.

Teams Participating

Matches

Semifinal 1

Semifinal 2

Final

References

Copa Pachuca